Ülo Vooglaid (born 21 April 1935) is an Estonian sociologist, educator and politician. He was a member of VII, VIII and X Riigikogu.

He has been a member of Res Publica Party.

References

Living people
1935 births
Res Publica Party politicians
Members of the Riigikogu, 1992–1995
Members of the Riigikogu, 1995–1999
Members of the Riigikogu, 2003–2007
Estonian sociologists
Recipients of the Order of the White Star, 4th Class
University of Tartu alumni
Academic staff of the University of Tartu
Politicians from Tallinn